Rentoul is a surname. Notable people with the surname include:

Erminda Rentoul Esler, née Erminda Rentoul, (1852? – 1924), Irish novelist 
Gervais Rentoul (1884–1946), British politician
Ida Rentoul Outhwaite, née Ida Rentoul, (1888–1960), Australian illustrator of children's books
James Alexander Rentoul (1854–1919), British judge and politician
John Rentoul (born 1958), British journalist
John Laurence Rentoul (1846–1926), Australian Presbyterian minister and poet